Luis Alberto López López  (born 25 August 1993) is a Mexican professional footballer who plays as a defender.

Honours
Mexico U23
Pan American Silver Medal: 2015
CONCACAF Olympic Qualifying Championship: 2015

References

External links
 

1993 births
Living people
Footballers from Nuevo León
C.F. Monterrey players
Liga MX players
FC Juárez footballers
Footballers at the 2015 Pan American Games
Pan American Games medalists in football
Pan American Games silver medalists for Mexico
Association football defenders
Medalists at the 2015 Pan American Games
Mexican footballers